Chenjiagang, often abbreviated to Chengang, is a town in Xiangshui County, Jiangsu, China.

Administrative divisions 

On July 3, 2001, Hai'an Ji  (海安集乡) was merged into Chenjiagang . No change was made to location names.

Education 
 Little Sun Kindergarten (小太阳幼儿园)
 Guandong Elementary School (响水县灌东小学) 
 Chenjiagang Central Elementary School (陈家港中心小学) 
 Chenjiagang Middle School (响水县陈家港中学)
 Guandong Middle School (陈家港镇灌东中学)
 Hai'an Ji: Hai'an Ji Central Elementary School (响水县海安集中心小学)
 Hai'an Ji: Xinmin Elementary School (陈家港新民小学), previously Hai'an Ji Xiang Xinmin Elementary School (海安集乡新民小学)
 Hai'an Ji: Hai'an Ji Middle School (响水县海安集中学)
 Hexin Cun: Yixin Elementary School (陈家港义新小学)
 Lili Cun: Lili  Elementary School (陈家港立礼小学)
 Xiaogang Cun: Xiangshui DFM Middle School (响水县东风中学) 
 Wangshang Cun: Wangshang Elementary School (陈家港王商小学)

Notable places 
 , previously known as Chenjiagang Chemical Concentration Zone (陈家港化工集中区).
  - a 50,000-tons grain storage spot located in Hai'an Ji.

See also 
 2019 Xiangshui chemical plant explosion

References 

 
Xiangshui
Township-level divisions of Jiangsu